The deputy leader of the Labour Party is the second-most senior politician within the Labour Party in New Zealand. The officeholder deputises for the leader of the Labour Party at party-specific events. Unlike other political party leaders, the Labour Party's leader does not have the power to dismiss or appoint their deputy; both the leader and deputy are elected. In all cases where the leadership is vacant, the deputy leader shall also serve as acting leader until a new leadership election. When the Labour Party forms the Official Opposition the deputy leader typically serves as deputy leader of the Opposition.

Kelvin Davis is the current Deputy Leader, elected on 1 August 2017.

History
The position of deputy leader of the New Zealand Labour Party was created in 1919, three years after the party's creation. The first holder, James McCombs, was bestowed the role after he lost the draw of lots to Harry Holland in the leadership election that year. It was not until 1974 that the party elected its first deputy to have been born in New Zealand, Bob Tizard. Prior to this, three deputy leaders had been born in Australia, two in England and one each in Ireland and Scotland. The Labour Party's longest-serving deputy leader, having served for 11 years, 4 months and 12 days between 1963 and 1974, was Hugh Watt.

To date, a total of seven deputy leaders have gone on to become the elected leader of the Labour Party (Savage, Fraser, Nash, Lange, Palmer, Clark and Ardern). Two deputy leaders have died in office (Skinner and Hackett).

List of deputy leaders
The following is a complete list of Labour Party deputy leaders. Some deputies served concurrently as acting party leader.

References

New Zealand Labour Party
New Zealand politics-related lists